Hypargos or Hypargus may refer to:

Pseudodrephalys hypargus, a butterfly species
Hypargos (bird), a genus of birds in the family Estrildidae